The Cudmore Creek is a stream in northeastern Kenora District in northwestern Ontario, Canada. It is a tributary of James Bay.

Cudmore Creek begins at the edge of a swamp and flows northeast to its mouth at James Bay, adjacent and to the south of the mouth of the Kapiskau River.

References

Sources

"Cudmore Creek" at Atlas of Canada. Accessed 2016-04-24.

Rivers of Kenora District
Tributaries of James Bay